Euonymus japonicus (evergreen spindle or Japanese spindle) is a species of flowering plant in the family Celastraceae, native to Japan, Korea and China. The flowers are inconspicuous, greenish-white, 5 mm diameter. In autumn, orange fruit hangs below the flaring pink seed coverings.

Horticultural cultivars
Euonymus japonicus is a popular ornamental plant for parks and gardens, both in its native area and also in Europe and North America. In particular the numerous cultivars which have been selected (often with variegated or yellow leaves) are widely grown in all soil types in sun or shade. Some of the more distinctive cultivars are:

 'Albomarginatus' - leaves green, narrowly margined white
 'Aureo-marginatus' - also called "Golden Euonymus", variegated green and butter yellow leaves
 'Bravo' - green and creamy-yellow variegated leaves, upright habit
 'Chollipo' 
 'Green Spire' - evergreen columnar narrow shrub
 'Kathy' - green and white variegated, broad leaves, shorter growing than most
 'Latifolius Albomarginatus' - green leaves with broad white margin
 'Ovatus Aureus' 
 'President Gauthier' - dark green and creamy-white variegated leaves, slightly more lax habit than others
 'Pulchellus Susan' - dark green leaves, narrowly marginated creamy-white
(those marked  have gained the Royal Horticultural Society's Award of Garden Merit)

References

External links
 
 

japonicus
Plants described in 1780